Bathyporeia is a genus of amphipods in the family Pontoporeiidae, containing the following species:

Bathyporeia borgi d'Udekem d'Acoz & Vader, 2005
Bathyporeia chevreuxi d'Udekem d'Acoz & Vader, 2005
Bathyporeia cunctator d'Udekem d'Acoz & Vader, 2005
Bathyporeia elegans Watkin, 1938
Bathyporeia elkaimi d'Udekem d'Acoz & Menioui, 2004
Bathyporeia gladiura d'Udekem d'Acoz & Vader, 2005
Bathyporeia gracilis Sars, 1891
Bathyporeia griffithsi d'Udekem d'Acoz & Vader, 2005
Bathyporeia guilliamsoniana (Bate, 1857)
Bathyporeia ledoyeri d'Udekem d'Acoz & Menioui, 2004
Bathyporeia leucophthalma Bellan-Santini, 1973
Bathyporeia lindstromi Stebbing, 1906
Bathyporeia megalops Chevreux, 1911
Bathyporeia microceras d'Udekem d'Acoz & Menioui, 2004
Bathyporeia nana Toulmond, 1966
Bathyporeia parkeri Bousfield, 1973
Bathyporeia pelagica (Bate, 1856)
Bathyporeia phaiophthalma Bellan-Santini, 1973
Bathyporeia pilosa Lindström, 1855
Bathyporeia pontica Marcusen, 1867
Bathyporeia pseudopelagica Bellan-Santini & Vader, 1988
Bathyporeia quoddyensis Shoemaker, 1949
Bathyporeia sardoa Bellan-Santini & Vader, 1988
Bathyporeia sarsi Watkin, 1938
Bathyporeia sophiae Bellan-Santini & Vader, 1988
Bathyporeia sunnivae Bellan-Santini & Vader, 1988
Bathyporeia tenuipes Meinert, 1877
Bathyporeia watkini d'Udekem d'Acoz, Echchaoui & Menioui, 2005

Bathy is from Greek bathos meaning deep, or depth and poreia is Greek meaning journey  or pertaining to walking.

References

Gammaridea